Darelys Yahel Santos Domínguez, (born June 28, 1994) is a Panamanian model and beauty pageant titleholder who winner of the Miss International Panamá 2017 title for Miss International 2017 contest and Miss Supranational Panamá 2020. She represented Panama at Miss International 2017 and placed Top 15, she also represented her country at Miss Supranational 2021 and placed Top 24, where she was ranked in 17th place.

Señorita Panamá 2017

Santos is 6 ft 1 in (1.86 m) tall, and competed in the national beauty pageant Señorita Panamá 2017 where she place as 1st runner-up. She represented the state of Panama Norte.

Miss International 2017

She represented Panamá in the 2017 Miss International pageant, that was held on November 14, 2017, in Tokyo, Japan. She finished in the Top 15 semifinalists.

Miss Supranational 2021
Due to the COVID-19 pandemic, on 9 October the Señorita Panamá Organization by virtual casting announced Santos as the new Señorita Panamá Supranational for the 2020 and will represent her country in the Miss Supranational 2021.

References

1995 births
Living people
Panamanian beauty pageant winners
Panamanian female models
Miss International 2017 delegates
Señorita Panamá